Ali Mohammad Bazar (also Romanized as ʿAlī Moḩammad Bāzār; also known as Moḩammad Bāzār) is a village in Pir Sohrab Rural District, in the Central District of Chabahar County, Sistan and Baluchestan Province, Iran. At the 2006 census, its population was 118, in 20 families.

References 

Populated places in Chabahar County